FamilyOFive, originally known as DaddyOFive, was a controversial YouTube channel and online alias of Michael Christopher "Mike" Martin (born December 17, 1982), which focused on daily vlogging and "prank" videos. At its peak, the channel's videos featured Martin, his wife Heather Martin—also known by her online alias MommyOFive—and their children. In 2017, following a series of "prank" videos showing the parents physically and emotionally abusing their children, the channel became the center of a public controversy, as outrage grew over their mistreatment of their children.

Created in 2015, the channel achieved success earning up to 176 million video views and around 750,000 subscribers at its peak. However, after the aforementioned controversy, all videos on the channel were removed, and Mike and Heather stopped producing videos on the channel, aside from a formal public apology video. Mike and Heather took an Alford plea in September 2017 in regards to two counts per person of Maryland state child neglect charges and received supervised probation for five years.

Mike and Heather ceased creating content on Mike's channel DaddyOFive as a result of court-ordered probation, but began producing similar content on the family's new channel called FamilyOFive, which was terminated by YouTube in July 2018 following renewed interest in the family. However, Mike and Heather have an official website, and a gaming channel on Twitch.

Rose Hall, the biological mother to Mike's two children Emma and Cody, said that she had not seen Cody since July 2014, when she was duped into signing court papers.

As of 2021, Mike is active on YouTube as The Martin Family.

History

Creation of channel and rise in popularity 
The channel was created on August 13, 2015; the channel's about page stated, "we as a FAMILY DECIDED to make this YouTube channel just for fun." The channel focused on Mike, Heather and their five children, whose names are Jake, Ryan, Emma, Cody, and Alex. Mike and Heather Martin have since had a child together since the channel's termination. Jake, Ryan and Alex are Heather's children from a previous marriage. Cody and Emma are Mike and his ex-girlfriend Rose Hall's children. The channel accumulated around 750,000 subscribers and 176 million views, prior to Mike removing the videos from public viewing. The Guardian and New York magazine reported the videos had been made private, while Time and The Washington Post reported that the videos had been deleted.

Controversy and public response 
The family became the center of abuse claims following these prank videos which became gradually more extreme, with many videos involving Mike encouraging his eldest child, Jake, to physically and mentally abuse his younger siblings, often to the point of severe injury and intense psychological distress. One such video involved Cody, the second youngest child, being thrown through a doorway by Jake and against a bookcase by Mike; he was left with what appeared to be injuries to his face. Another video involved Alex, the youngest, being instructed by Mike to slap, Emma, the middle child (who is Cody's biological sister) across the face for failing to perform a water bottle flip correctly; he was never reprimanded, despite leaving Emma visibly hurt. American YouTube personality and news commentator Philip DeFranco released a series of videos covering the channel and sharing his distaste for the content they created, starting with "WOW... We Need To Talk About This..." on April 17, 2017. He primarily focused on a video involving invisible ink being spilled, with Cody and Alex being falsely accused of making the mess. In the video, Cody cries and pleads hysterically after being screamed and sworn at and accused of lying, with Alex also facing a similar treatment from Mike and Heather. DeFranco's first video covering the channel was uploaded on April 17, and is credited by many news outlets for shining a light on the channel's extreme content. Andrew Griffin of The Independent wrote, "[DeFranco's] video was viewed more than three million times and brought widespread condemnation of the DaddyOFive channel." The video has led to debates about sharenting and children being minor celebrities on social media. Emma and Cody were removed from their custody and returned to their biological mother. The creators also issued a public apology for the videos and said they were "a loving, close-knit family."

Post-controversy status and plea agreement 
Mike's channel DaddyOFive released a video on July 7, 2017, showing text expressing that it is not a dead channel and asking viewers to subscribe to Heather's MommyOFive channel for new videos and updates. In July 2017, Mike's channel and Heather's channel had both around 730,000 subscribers and 4.7 million video views, and around 110,000 subscribers and 2.1 million video views, respectively. Later, they changed their channel name to FamilyOFive after receiving the YouTube Creator Award's Silver Play Button for Heather.

Prosecutors from the Frederick County Circuit Court filed criminal charges against Mike and Heather in August 2017, with them facing two counts of "neglect of a minor" apart. On September 11, 2017, Mike and Heather pleaded guilty by way of an Alford plea and were sentenced to five years of supervised probation.

Second termination 
The FamilyOFive channel, a new outlet for Mike and Heather's videos created while they were on probation, re-instituted the questionable pattern of behavior regarding abuse of Jake, Ryan, Emma, Cody and Alex featured in the videos. The channel was subsequently terminated on July 18, 2018, for violating YouTube's Community Guidelines, according to several news sources, and YouTube now requires videos featuring children to comply with local child labor laws.

Attempted comeback 
Despite their second attempt at publishing content on YouTube being met with termination, for a limited time, Mike and Heather continued to post videos on their official website behind a monthly $5 subscription fee, and continued streaming gaming videos on their Twitch channel. As of January 2019, Mike and Heather have deleted all of the videos on their website, stating "In order to move on with the healing process from the 2017 events, we have AGREED WILLINGLY to remove our videos, from even this site. For the sake and well being of our family Mike and I feel it is best that we take a long break from the public spotlight."

On November 11, 2018, Jake, Ryan and Alex created a new YouTube channel called The Martin Boys.
On January 8, 2019, Mike was accused of uploading a video in August 2018, which featured Cody. Despite breaking a major probation rule, Mike and Heather's supervised probation was reduced to probation before judgement.

In June 2019, it was reported that Mike had started a SoundCloud channel, uploading his music as "Mikey M".

See also 
 Fantastic Adventures scandal, a 2019 YouTube scandal also revolving around intentional child abuse committed against children who appeared in the videos of a channel on the site.

References 

Living people
1982 births
2015 establishments in Maryland
2017 controversies
2018 disestablishments in Maryland
21st-century American criminals
American YouTubers
Child abuse in the United States
Child abuse incidents and cases
Gaming YouTubers
Internet-related controversies
Let's Players
Male bloggers
Online obscenity controversies
People from Maryland
YouTube vloggers
YouTube channels closed in 2018
YouTube channels launched in 2015
YouTube controversies
Scandals in Maryland
Entertainment scandals
Twitch (service) streamers